Anthony Denis Davidson (born 18 April 1979) is a British former racing driver, currently working as an analyst for the Sky Sports F1 television channel, as part of the commentary team for WEC TV, as colour commentator for the F1 series of video games, and as simulator and demonstration driver for Mercedes AMG Petronas. He is best known for racing in Formula One for Minardi and Super Aguri, and has been a test or reserve driver for the British American Racing, Honda, and Brawn GP teams. Davidson was the 2014 WEC World Champion, alongside his teammate, Sébastien Buemi.

Driving career
Born in Hemel Hempstead, Hertfordshire, Davidson began kart racing in 1987, competing in various British, European and North American championships. He won three British championships (93, 94, 95), one Italian championship and was runner-up in the Formula A European championship in 1996. In 1999, he moved to single seater cars, racing Formula Fords and winning the 1600 cc Kent engine class of the British Formula Ford festival that year. The following season, he was runner-up in the British Formula Ford championship but did win the blue riband Formula Ford Festival at Brands Hatch and scooped the McLaren/Autosport Young Driver of the Year Award.

In 2001, Davidson competed in the British Formula Three championship with the Carlin team, finishing second overall to teammate Takuma Sato. His performance improved throughout the season and he outscored Sato from June until the season's end. He also won the Formula Three Pau Grand Prix, the Spa Masters and the FIA European Cup.

Formula One

BAR and Minardi
In late 2000, Davidson became the test driver for the British American Racing (BAR) Formula One team for the  season. The following season Davidson started two races for the Minardi team, temporarily replacing regular driver Alex Yoong, who the team had decided to suspend after he had failed to qualify for three races. Minardi had originally planned to put Justin Wilson in the car, but he proved too tall. Davidson's qualifying times were within 0.6s of teammate Mark Webber at his two starts in Hungary and Belgium, but he spun out of both events.

Race drivers were Jacques Villeneuve and Davidson's countryman Jenson Button who joined the team from Renault. When Takuma Sato was promoted to the race team following the departure of Villeneuve, it presented Davidson with the opportunity to become third driver. He frequently impressed with his pace, other teams frequently taking note of his consistent lap times for tyre degradation data. e.g. at Indianapolis he set the second fastest lap time in Friday practice after 19 laps.

Given BAR's long-term contract on Davidson, his chance of securing a race seat for 2005 was therefore called into serious doubt. He was given the opportunity to fill in for an unwell Sato at the 2005 Malaysian Grand Prix, but his engine expired just two laps into the event.

Honda

In 2006 Davidson resumed his role as test driver for BAR, now owned by Honda and renamed Honda Racing F1. As BAR had failed to be one of the top four constructors the previous season Honda were able to run a third car on Friday, giving Davidson a bigger role than in 2005. Having previously done some radio commentary work for BBC Radio Five Live, in 2006 he made his debut as a television commentator, standing in for the absent Martin Brundle for ITV Sport at the Hungarian Grand Prix, which was won by Jenson Button and the Honda team. In 2008 Davidson returned to Honda as test driver for the testing at Spain's Circuit de Catalunya whilst Honda test driver Alexander Wurz was racing at Le Mans.

Super Aguri

On 15 November 2006, Super Aguri confirmed that Davidson would partner Takuma Sato for the 2007 Formula One season. Thus, he became a regular Formula One driver for the first time.

At the 2007 Canadian Grand Prix Davidson was running third when his car struck a groundhog on the straight before the pits, ultimately putting him back to 11th place and ending his bid for his first career points. At the Hungarian Grand Prix Davidson's rear suspension was broken during a collision with Giancarlo Fisichella, which forced him to retire. Davidson finished the season in 23rd place having scored no points.

However, on 6 May 2008 Super Aguri withdrew from the Championship leaving Davidson without a race seat.

Return to Honda
On 5 December 2008 Honda pulled out of Formula One due to financial problems. Ross Brawn bought out the team and formed Brawn GP and Davidson signed on as a test driver. On 16 November 2009, engine suppliers Mercedes-Benz bought out Brawn GP and renamed the team Mercedes GP. Davidson continued in his role as reserve and development driver.

Mercedes (2010–present)
Davidson was linked with incoming teams Virgin and Lotus for the 2010 F1 season. However, Davidson did not secure a 2010 race seat in F1, and instead turned his focus to racing sports cars. In F1 he continued his long-standing relationship with the Brackley-based Mercedes F1 Team, combining duties as reserve and simulator driver in 2010 and 2011, and continuing his simulator role from 2012.

Sportscars

Davidson raced for the Aston Martin Racing team in the 2009 24 Hours of Le Mans, alongside Darren Turner and Jos Verstappen. His team drove Lola-Aston Martin B09/60 in the LMP1 class, which finished 13th overall in the race. He returned in the 2010 edition, driving for defending champions Team Peugeot Total alongside Alexander Wurz and Marc Gené. The trio warmed up for Le Mans by leading a Peugeot 1–2 in the 2010 12 Hours of Sebring. However, in the Le Mans race his Peugeot car had an engine failure while leading. Following Le Mans, Davidson raced at the 2010 6 Hours of Silverstone with Nicolas Minassian and secured victory for Peugeot Sport. In October 2010, Davidson secured pole position at Petit Le Mans, and went on to finish second with teammates Alex Wurz and Marc Gené.

In 2011, racing the 908 for Peugeot Sport, Davidson along with Wurz and Gené, won the 6 Hours of Spa, and finished 4th at the Le Mans 24 Hours. Teaming up with Sébastien Bourdais, Davidson went on to win the 6 Hours of Imola, and the 6 Hours of Zhuhai, victories which helped Peugeot Sport secure the Intercontinental Le Mans Cup (ILMC) Championship for the second year running.

With Peugeot pulling out of factory sports car competition, Davidson signed with Toyota to drive its Toyota TS030 Hybrid in the 2012 24 Hours of Le Mans. Five hours into the race, as Davidson was lapping the AF Corse Ferrari 458 Italia GTC of Piergiuseppe Perazzini, the two cars collided at the end of the Mulsanne Straight. The collision turned Davidson's car sideways before becoming airborne, flipping through the air, before landing back on its 3 remaining wheels before making heavy contact with the barriers. Davidson got out of his car before calling for assistance; he was later transferred to hospital where he was later diagnosed with fractures to the eleventh and twelfth thoracic vertebrae of his back.

In 2013, Davidson continued driving with Toyota for a full season and ended with third place in the drivers' championship and 2nd place at Le Mans with teammates Buemi and Sarrazin. For the 2014 season he remained with the Toyota works team and drove Toyota's new car, the Toyota TS040 Hybrid. During the year he won four races and finished third in the 2014 24 Hours of Le Mans, and became 2014 World Endurance Drivers' Champion alongside co-driver Sébastien Buemi. The following two years were less successful, yielding only two third-place finishes and championship finishes in fifth in 2015 and eighth in 2016.

The 2017 FIA World Endurance Championship season showed an improvement in form, and Davidson and his co-drivers took five victories and one further podium finish for the Toyota team during the campaign. However, the performance of the Porsche team, a sixth-place finish at Le Mans, and missing the 2017 6 Hours of Circuit of the Americas due to "personal reasons", contributed to Davidson finishing the season only third in the drivers' championship standings.

Despite his 2017 performance, Davidson was the crew member of the number 8 Toyota entry who was moved aside to allow Fernando Alonso to contest the 2018–19 FIA World Endurance Championship. Toyota switched Davidson backward into a test and reserve role, and he did not compete in the first two races of the 'superseason', including the 2018 24 Hours of Le Mans. He made his first race appearance in 2018 at Silverstone, driving in the LMP2 class for American team DragonSpeed, where he finished fourth in class.

Non-driving activities

Commentating
He has since been heard as a co-commentator on selected Grands Prix for BBC Radio 5 Live. This became permanent on 13 February 2009, when it was announced he would commentate alongside David Croft for the  season. Davidson continued in the role through  into , as the BBC decided on an unchanged lineup for its radio Formula One coverage.
On 7 December 2011, Sky Sports announced that Davidson would join its British team as an analyst for race weekends, and would be commentating on practice sessions from the 2012 season.

He commentated alongside Croft for the 2017 Hungarian Grand Prix to cover for Paul di Resta who was needed by Williams to cover for the ill Felipe Massa. Di Resta was himself covering for regular commentator Martin Brundle who was absent through illness with the same condition that afflicted Massa.

He is also one of the lead commentators on the FIA World Endurance Championship world feed along with Martin Haven and Graham Goodwin, starting in the 2022 season

Helmet
In the studio for 2013 USA Grand Prix qualifying Davidson admitted that his design was inspired by Eddie Cheever's helmet. When he was in the early karting days of his career he saw the picture of Cheever's helmet and together with his father who was a graphic designer changed the colours from the Arizona state flag to the colours of the UK & EU flags which he has been using for all of his career.

Codemasters Formula One games
Davidson has been working as an advisor for Codemasters since 2009 with F1 2009, and F1 2010 which was released in September 2010. His helmet design is available to select for the user's driver in the game. He later worked with Codemasters-Birmingham on F1 2011 and F1 2012. Davidson and David Croft appeared in F1 2015, F1 2016, F1 2017, F1 2018, F1 2019, F1 2020, F1 2021 and F1 22 as commentators.

Personal life
On 11 August 2006, Davidson married his girlfriend Carrie in Banbury, Oxfordshire. The couple live in Brackley. His brother Andrew Davidson appeared in the first series of Big Brother in the UK. When Andrew was up for eviction in week two, housemate Darren nominated him, giving as a reason that his brother had a race the following week and he would want to leave the house to see him. Andrew was evicted that week.

He was friends growing up with the late Dan Wheldon, who competed in IndyCar.

Racing record

Career summary

† In addition to competing in the 24 Hours of Le Mans race, Peugeot Sport only contested selected events in the 2010 and 2011 Le Mans and American Le Mans Series.
‡ As Davidson was a guest driver, he was ineligible for points.

Complete Formula One results
(key) (Races in bold indicate pole position; races in italics'' indicate fastest lap)

† Did not finish the race, but was classified as he had completed more than 90% of the race distance.

Complete 24 Hours of Le Mans results

Complete FIA World Endurance Championship results

References

External links

 
 

1979 births
Living people
People from Brackley
Sportspeople from Hemel Hempstead
English racing drivers
English Formula One drivers
Minardi Formula One drivers
BAR Formula One drivers
Super Aguri Formula One drivers
Karting World Championship drivers
Formula Ford drivers
British Formula Three Championship drivers
24 Hours of Le Mans drivers
American Le Mans Series drivers
European Le Mans Series drivers
24 Hours of Daytona drivers
Rolex Sports Car Series drivers
FIA World Endurance Championship drivers
24 Hours of Spa drivers
Motorsport announcers
12 Hours of Sebring drivers
Carlin racing drivers
Haywood Racing drivers
Manor Motorsport drivers
Aston Martin Racing drivers
Peugeot Sport drivers
Toyota Gazoo Racing drivers
DragonSpeed drivers
Jota Sport drivers
Nismo drivers